Eupithecia maestosa is a moth in the  family Geometridae first described by George Duryea Hulst in 1896. It is found in North America from extreme western Alberta west to Vancouver Island, north to northern British Columbia and south to Texas and California. The habitat consists of wooded and shrubby areas.

The wingspan is 17–21 mm. Adults are dark yellow brown and grey. They are on wing nearly year round in California.

References

Moths described in 1896
maestosa
Moths of North America